Brasileiro is a 1992 album by Sérgio Mendes and other artists including Carlinhos Brown which won the 1993 Grammy Award for Best World Music Album.

Track listing
 "Fanfarra" (Carlinhos Brown)– 4:03
 "Magalenha" (Carlinhos Brown)– 3:39
 "Indiado" (Carlinhos Brown)– 4:17
 "What Is This?" (Carmen Alice)– 4:46
 "Lua Soberana" (Vítor Martins, Ivan Lins)– 4:13
 "Sambadouro" (Vítor Martins, Ivan Lins)– 3:51
 "Senhoras Do Amazonas" (Antonio Carlos Belchior, João Bosco)– 4:41
 "Kalimba" (Vítor Martins, Ivan Lins)– 4:19
 "Barabare" (Paulinho Camafeu, Edmundo Caruso, Carlinhos Brown)– 3:24
 "Esconjuros" (Aldir Blanc, Carlos "Guinga" Escobar)– 3:40
 "Pipoca" (Hermeto Pascoal)– 3:10
 "Magano" (Carlinhos Brown)– 4:36
 "Chorado" (Aldir Blanc, Carlos "Guinga" Escobar)– 3:24
 "Fanfarra" (Despedida) (Carlinhos Brown)– 0:29

Personnel 

Musicians and Arrangements
 Sérgio Mendes – arrangements (1-10, 12, 13, 14), keyboards (3-13), synthesizers (3, 4, 5, 7-10, 12), percussion (6, 9, 12)
 Alfredo Moura – keyboards (3, 9, 12), synthesizers (3, 9, 12), synth horns (3, 12), arrangements (3, 9, 12)
 Eric Persing – keyboard and synthesizer programming (3, 4, 5, 8, 9, 12, 13), synth horn programming (3, 12), keyboard programming (6), arrangements (4), keyboards (13), synthesizers (13)
 Robbie Buchanan – keyboards (5, 8), synthesizers (5, 8), synthesizer effects (7)
 Russell Ferrante – keyboards (10), synthesizers (10)
 Hermeto Pascoal – keyboards (11), arrangements (11)
 Jovino Santos Neto – keyboards (11)
 Alceu Do Cavaco – cavaquinho (1)
 Paul Jackson Jr. – guitars (3, 5, 6, 8, 9)
 Cláudio Jorge – acoustic guitar (6)
 João Bosco – acoustic guitar (7)
 Guinga (Carlos Althier de Souza Lemos Escobar)  – acoustic guitar (10, 13)
 Jimmy Johnson – bass (3, 9, 10)
 Nathan East – bass (5, 6, 8)
 Arthur Maia – bass (7)
 Itibere Zwarg – bass (11)
 Jeff Porcaro – drums (3, 5, 8, 9), percussion (7)
 Mike Shapiro – drums (6), percussion (10, 11)
 Carlos Bala – drums (7)
 Marcio Bahia – drums (11)
 Carlinhos Brown – percussion (2, 3, 4, 10, 12), arrangements (2, 3, 12)
 Vai Quem Vem – percussion (2, 4, 9, 12)
 Luis Conte – percussion (5-8, 11)
 Beloba (Carlos Da Silva Pinto) – percussion (6)
 Sebastião Neto – percussion (9, 12)
 Meia Noite – percussion (10)
 Fabio Pascoal – percussion (11)
 Pernambuco (Antonio Luis de Santana) – percussion (11)
 Jerry Moore – tenor saxophone (3)
 Steve Tavaglione – flutes (10), oboes (10), alto saxophone (12), tenor saxophone (12)
 Carlos Malta – flute (11), saxophone (11)
 Moogie Canazio – arrangements (1, 4)
 Bruce Swedien – arrangements (4)

Vocalists
 Sérgio Mendes – vocals (1), backing vocals (2, 3, 4, 6, 11, 12)
 Francisca Maria Monjardim – vocals (1), backing vocals (2, 12)
 Leila Monjardim – vocals (1), backing vocals (2, 12)
 Sebastião Neto – vocals (1), backing vocals (2, 3, 12)
 Lourenco Olegario – vocals (1), backing vocals (2, 3, 12)
 Karla Preito – vocals (1), backing vocals (2, 12)
 Jurema Silva – vocals (1), backing vocals (2, 12)
 Jussara Silva – vocals (1), backing vocals (2, 12)
 Leo Silva – vocals (1), backing vocals (2, 3, 12)
 Robson Silva – vocals (1), backing vocals (2, 3, 12)
 Carlinhos Brown – lead vocals (2, 3, 9, 12), backing vocals (3)
 Gracinha Leporace – lead vocals (3, 5, 7-10), backing vocals (3-6, 8), vocals (6, 11)
 Carmen Alice – lead vocals (4)
 Kleber Jorge – backing vocals (4, 6)
 Kevyn Lettau – backing vocals (4, 5, 6, 8), vocals (6, 11), lead vocals (8)
 Vivian Manso – backing vocals (4, 5, 6, 8)
 Alfredo Moura – backing vocals (4, 6)
 Carol Rogers – backing vocals (4, 6), vocals (6)
 Mike Shapiro – backing vocals (4, 6)
 Val Quem Vem – backing vocals (4)
 Carolina Saboia – backing vocals (5, 8)
 Joe Pizzulo – backing vocals (6), vocals (11)
 João Bosco – lead vocals (7)
 Cláudio Nucci – lead vocals (13)

Production 
 Sérgio Mendes – producer
 Moogie Canazio – engineer, mixing (1, 2, 3, 5, 8-14)
 Bruce Swedien – mixing (4, 6, 7)
 Michael Aarvold – assistant engineer
 Elaine Anderson – assistant engineer
 Ivan Carvalho – assistant engineer
 Lee Kaiser – assistant engineer
 Luis Quine – assistant engineer
 Paul Scriver – assistant engineer
 Bernie Grundman – mastering at Bernie Grundman Mastering (Hollywood, California)
 David Bither – art direction
 John Heiden – art direction, design
 Heitor Dos Prazeres – cover artwork 
 George Holz – back cover photography
 Sonia Ives – booklet photography
 Chris McGowan – liner notes

See also
Sérgio Mendes

References

Bossa nova albums
1992 albums
Sérgio Mendes albums
Albums produced by Sérgio Mendes
Elektra Records albums
Grammy Award for Best World Music Album